Anathode dam (Malayalam :ആനത്തോട് അണക്കെട്ട് ) is a flanking dam of masonry gravity type situated in Sethathode panchayath of Seethathode village in Pathanamthitta district of Kerala, India. This dam is constructed on  Anathode river which is a tributary of Pamba river.

Anathode is a stream which joins Kakki River downstream of Kakki Dam before the confluence with Pamba River. The dam makes a common reservoir with Kakki. The spillway for the reservoir complex is located by the side of Anathode Flanking Dam. The reservoirs formed by the two dams are connected through the natural valley. Kakki & Anathode dams are about 4 kilometers apart by road. Taluks through which release flows are Ranni, Konni, Kozhencherry, Thiruvalla, Chengannur, Kuttanadu, Mavelikara and Karthikappally.

Specifications

Latitude : 9⁰20’30”N
Longitude : 77⁰09’00”
Panchayath : Seethathodu
Type of Dam : Masonry – Gravity
Village : Seethathodu
District : Pathanamthitta
River Basin : Pamba
River:Kakki- Anathodu (a tributory of Pamba river)
Release from Dam to river : Pamba
Year of completion:1967
Classification : HH (High Height)
Maximum Water Level (MWL) : EL 982.16 m
Full Reservoir Level ( FRL) : EL 981.46 m
Storage at FRL : 454.14 Mm3
Height from deepest foundation : 51.81 m
Length : 376.12 m
Spillway : 4 No. radial gates, each of size 12.8 x 6.1m
Crest Level : EL 975.36 m

References

External links
Project Sabarigiri telefilm

Dams in Kerala